The 1979 All-Ireland Senior Hurling Championship was the 93rd staging of the All-Ireland hurling championship since its establishment by the Gaelic Athletic Association in 1887. The championship began on 27 May 1979 and ended on 2 September 1978.

Cork entered the championship as defending champions, however, they were beaten by Galway in the All-Ireland semi-final. Kilkenny won the title after defeating Galway by 2–12 to 1–8 in the final.

Teams

A total of eleven teams contested the championship, one of the fewest participants in years. Only four team contested the Leinster series of games. Kildare, Laois and Westmeath withdrew from the provincial campaign, however, Laois did qualify for the All-Ireland series by winning the All-Ireland Senior B Hurling Championship. They did this at Antrim's expense. Kerry withdrew from the Munster championship.

Team summaries

Results

Leinster Senior Hurling championship

Munster Senior Hurling championship

All-Ireland Senior Hurling Championship

Championship statistics

Miscellaneous

 Cork capture a record-equalling fifth successive Munster title following a victory over Limerick.  It is the second time that Cork have achieved the five-in-a-row, the first since 1905.
 In the All-Ireland semi-final, Galway defeat Cork for only the second time in the history of the championship.  It is Cork's first defeat since the All-Ireland semi-final of 1975 when the same opposition recorded their first win over 'the Rebels'.

Top scorers

Season

Single game

Broadcasting

The following matches were broadcast live on television in Ireland on RTÉ.

Sources

 Corry, Eoghan, The GAA Book of Lists (Hodder Headline Ireland, 2005).
 Donegan, Des, The Complete Handbook of Gaelic Games (DBA Publications Limited, 2005).

References

1979
All-Ireland Senior Hurling Championship